A Happening In Central Park is the first live album by Barbra Streisand. It was recorded at a live concert in Central Park in New York in June 1967 in front of an audience of 125,000 people. The special aired on CBS channel in 1968, with selected moments from the live show that in its entirety featured thirty three songs. From the show Streisand developed a stage panic that caused her to perform rarely in subsequent years. According to Streisand: "I forgot the words in front of 125,000 people-and I wasn't cute about it or anything", "I was shocked; I was terrified. It prevented me from performing for all these years". She said to ABC News that:  "I didn't sing and charge people for 27 years because of that night ... I was like, 'God, I don't know. What if I forget the words again?'"

On November 1, 1986, Billboard announced that a VHS tape would be released via CBS/Fox Video, with a new introduction made by Barbra talking about her experience doing the live performance. In 2005, Columbia released a box that contained five DVDs, each with the five TV specials that the singer released in the 1960s and 1970s, including the special "A Happening In Central Park". The DVD was released individually in 2007.

In 2018, the singer revealed on her Twitter that the special, along with others released in the box, could be watched via streaming on Netflix that same year.

Commercial performance
The album peaked at number 30 in the US and has been certified gold for sales of 500,000 copies.

Track listing

Notes:
 signifies arranged by

Personnel
Warren Vincent - sound supervision
Edward T. Graham, Stan Weiss, Phil Macy, Arthur Kendy - engineer
New York Times - cover photograph

DVD
"Introduction"
"The Nearness Of You"
"Down With Love"
"Love Is Like A New Born Child"
"Cry Me A River"
"Folk Monologue/Value"
"Can See It" 
"The Sound Of Music"
"Mississippi Mud"
"Santa Claus Is Coming To Town"
"Love Is Bore"
"He Touched Me"
"English Folk Song"
"I'm All Smiles"
"Marty The Martian"
"Natural Sounds"
"Second Hand Rose"
"People"
"Silent Night (Sleep In Heavenly Peace)"
"Happy Days Are Here Again"

Charts

Certifications and sales

References

1968 live albums
Barbra Streisand live albums
Columbia Records live albums
Albums recorded at Central Park